Integration may refer to:

Biology 
Multisensory integration
Path integration
 Pre-integration complex, viral genetic material used to insert a viral genome into a host genome
DNA integration, by means of site-specific recombinase technology, performed by a specific class of recombinase enzymes ("integrases")

Economics and law 
Economic integration, trade unification between different states
Horizontal integration and vertical integration, in microeconomics and strategic management, styles of ownership and control
Regional integration, in which states cooperate through regional institutions and rules
Integration clause, a declaration that a contract is the final and complete understanding of the parties
A step in the process of money laundering
Integrated farming, a farm management system
Integration (tax), a feature of corporate and personal income tax in some countries

Engineering 
Data integration
Digital integration
Enterprise integration
Integrated architecture, in an Enterprise architecture framework approach such as DoDAF
Integrated circuit, an electronic circuit whose components are manufactured in one flat piece of semiconductor material
Integrated design, an approach to design which brings together specialisms usually considered separately
Integrated product team, use of a team including multiple disciplines (e.g. customer, engineer, support, testing)
Integrated software
System integration, engineering practices for assembling large and complicated systems from units, particularly subsystems

Mathematics 
 Integration, the computation of an integral
 Indefinite integration, the computation of antiderivatives
 Numerical integration, computing an integral with a numerical method, usually with a computer
 Integration by parts, a method for computing the integral of a product of functions
 Integration by substitution, a method for computing integrals, by using a change of variable
 Symbolic integration, the computation, mostly on computers, of antiderivatives and definite integrals in term of formulas
 Integration, the computation of a solution of a differential equation or a system of differential equations:
 Integrability conditions for differential systems
 Integrable system
 Order of integration, in statistics, a summary statistic for a time series

Sociology 
Social integration, in social science, a movement of newcomers or marginalized minorities into the mainstream of a society
Racial integration, including desegregation and other changes in social opportunity and culture
Desegregation, ending a separation of races, particularly in the context of the American civil rights movement
Educational integration of students with disabilities

Other uses 
Integration (festival), an annual technology and cultural festival managed by the Indian Statistical Institute
Integration (album), a 2011 album by Kellee Maize
Integration, an album by Kultur Shock

See also 
Desegregation, the process of ending the separation of two groups, usually races
Interdisciplinarity, involves the combining of two or more academic disciplines into one activity (e.g. a research project)
Integrity, a concept of consistency of actions, values, methods, measures, principles, expectations, and outcomes
Disintegration (disambiguation)
Integral (disambiguation)